Wicker is a surname. Notable people by that name include:

 Allan Wicker (born 1941), psychologist. 
 Bob Wicker (1878–1955), American baseball player.
 Cassius Milton Wicker (1846–1913), railroad manager and banker.  
 Dennis A. Wicker (born 1952), American lawyer and politician.
 Floyd Wicker (born 1943), American former professional baseball outfielder.
 George R. Wicker (1877–1935), American agricultural businessman.
 Ireene Wicker (1905–1987), American singer and actress.
 John J. Wicker, Jr. (1893–1985), American lawyer and Democratic politician.
 Kemp Wicker (1906–1973), American pitcher in Major League Baseball.
 Louis Wicker (born 1959), American atmospheric scientist.
 Nancy L. Wicker, professor of art history at the University of Mississippi.
 Randy Wicker (born 1938), American author, activist and blogger. 
 Roger Wicker (born 1951), U.S. Senator for Mississippi.
 Tom Wicker (1926–2011), American journalist.
 Veronica DiCarlo Wicker (1930–1994), United States federal judge.